Entente Feignies Aulnoye Football Club is a football club based in Feignies, France. Founded in 1951 as Sporting Club de Feignies, the club plays in the Championnat National 3, the fifth tier in the French football league system, as of the 2021–22 season.

History 
Sporting Club de Feignies was founded in 1951.

Feignies had a run of promotions in the first decade of the 21st century. As recently as 1999, they were playing in regional divisions at the ninth tier of French football, rising to the fourth tier of the French leagues, the Championnat de France Amateurs in 2005, where they played one season.

In the summer of 2016 SC Feignies merged with neighbouring side AS Aulnoye-Aymeries, who were relegated from CFA 2 at the end of the 2015–16 season, to form the current club.

In the round of 64 of the 2021–22 Coupe de France, Feignies Aulnoye met Ligue 1 giants Paris Saint-Germain. The match, played at the Stade du Hainaut in Valenciennes, ended in a 3–0 victory for the Parisians.

References

External links 
 Official Site of SC Feignies (last updated January 2016) 
 Official Site of AS Aulnoye, now official site of Entente Feignies Aulnoye FC 

Football clubs in France
Association football clubs established in 1951
1951 establishments in France
Sport in Nord (French department)
Football clubs in Hauts-de-France